Kohut, Kogut, or Kohout is a surname of Slavic-language origin, meaning rooster. Notable people with the surname include:

Kohut 
 Adolph Kohut (1848–1917), German-Hungarian journalist and historian
 Andrew Kohut (1942–2015), American pollster
 Alexander Kohut (1842–1894), rabbinic scholar
 Bohdan Kohut (born 1987), Ukrainian footballer
 Elisabeth Kohut-Mannstein (1843–1926), German soprano
 Emanuel Kohút (born 1982), Slovak volleyball player
 George Alexander Kohut (1874–1933), American rabbi, writer, and bibliographer
 George Kohut (1943–2014), American camera operator
 Heinz Kohut (1913–1981), American psychoanalyst
 Ihor Kohut (born 1996), Ukrainian footballer
 Jean-Pierre Kohut-Svelko (born 1946), French production designer and art director
 Józef Kohut (1922–1970), Polish ice hockey player
 Łukasz Kohut (born 1982), Polish politician
 Michael J. Kohut (1943–2012), American audio engineer
 Oleksandra Kohut (born 1987), Ukrainian sport wrestler
 Oswald Kohut (1877–1951), German writer
 Rebekah Bettelheim Kohut (1864–1951), American Jewish women's leader
 Ron Cahute (born 1955), Ukrainian-Canadian musician
 Sławomir Kohut (born 1977), Polish cyclist
 Stacy Kohut (born 1970), Canadian Paralympic skier
 Vilmos Kohut (1906–1986), Hungarian footballer
 Walter Kohut (1927–1980), Austrian actor
 Zenon Kohut (born 1944), Ukrainian-Canadian historian
 Michael Kohut (born 1984), American businessman and financier

Kogut 
 Bruce Kogut (born 1953), American organizational theorist
 John Kogut (born 1945), American theoretical physicist
 Sandra Kogut (born 1965), Brazilian filmmaker
 Stanisław Kogut (born 1953), Polish politician
 Volodymyr Kogut (born 1984), Ukrainian track cyclist

See also
 
 
Kohout

Jewish surnames
Ukrainian-language surnames